La La Means I Love You is the debut studio album by American vocal group The Delfonics. It was released via Philly Groove Records in 1968. It peaked at number 100 on the Billboard 200 chart.

Critical reception
Lindsay Planer of AllMusic gave the album 4.5 out of 5 stars, writing, "[Thom] Bell's trademark easy and languid rhythms, when married to the trio's lush vocal harmonies, add new hues to the sonic soul music palette of the late '60s and early '70s."

In 2004, Philadelphia Weekly placed it at number 17 on the "100 Best Philly Albums of All Time" list. In 2017, Pitchfork placed it at number 154 on the "200 Best Albums of the 1960s" list.

Track listing

Charts

References

External links
 

1968 debut albums
The Delfonics albums
Albums produced by Thom Bell
Albums arranged by Thom Bell
Philly Groove Records albums